Bruno Irles (born 16 August 1975) is a French professional football manager and former player who was most recently the head coach of Ligue 1 club Troyes.

Early life and playing career
Irles was born in Rochefort, Charente-Maritime. He started his senior career with Monaco in the Ligue 1, where he made 83 appearances without scoring.

References

External links

1975 births
Living people
People from Rochefort, Charente-Maritime
Sportspeople from Charente-Maritime
French footballers
Association football defenders
AS Monaco FC players
Ligue 1 players
France under-21 international footballers
French football managers
AC Arlésien managers
FC Sheriff Tiraspol managers
Pau FC managers
US Quevilly-Rouen Métropole managers
ES Troyes AC managers
Moldovan Super Liga managers
Ligue 2 managers
French expatriate football managers
Expatriate football managers in Moldova
French expatriate sportspeople in Moldova
Footballers from Nouvelle-Aquitaine